Flash Is Back is the sixth studio album released in 1998 by Grandmaster Flash. The music was co-written with Arthur Baker with Flash writing all the lyrics. It was his first studio release since On the Strength in 1988 and his first solo album since Ba-Dop-Boom-Bang in 1987. He would not release another studio album until The Bridge (Concept of a Culture) in 2009.

It was released on Marlboro Music in Germany only and was distributed by BMG. A double vinyl LP and a CD version were issued. No singles were released from the album.

Track listing
"Groove to Get Down" – 4:14
"Gotta Get Busy" – 4:53
"Whatever the Hell It's Working" – 5:20
"This Is the Way" – 4:30
"Sex on the Scratch" – 4:53
"Coolcuts" – 4:55
"Let's Have Some Action" – 2:56
"Brothers Be Fronting" – 2:55
"Flashes Theme" – 3:51
"Little Bit of Flash" (Midfield General Skint Mix) – 8:04
"Flash Is Back" (Danielson for Skint Mix) – 5:27
"Dance to the Beat" (Grandmaster Flash vs Stretch & Vern) – 8:50

References

External links
 [ Flash Is Back at AllMusic]

1998 albums
Grandmaster Flash albums
Albums produced by Arthur Baker (musician)